Rodrigo Ibáñez  (died 1 March 1335) was a Roman Catholic prelate who served as Bishop of Tui (1326–1335) and Bishop of Lugo (1319–1320).

Biography
On 25 September 1319 Rodrigo Ibáñez was appointed by the King of Spain and confirmed by John XXII as Bishop of Lugo. On 4 May 1320, he was consecrated bishop by Berenguel Landore, Archbishop of Santiago de Compostela with Pedro Méndez Sotomayor y Meiras, Bishop of Coria, and Diego Fernandi, Bishop of Zamora, as co-consecrators. On 3 September 1326, he was appointed by John XXII as Bishop of Tui. He served as Bishop of Tui until his death on 1 March 1335.

See also 
Catholic Church in Spain

References

External links and additional sources
 (for Chronology of Bishops) 
 (for Chronology of Bishops) 
 (for Chronology of Bishops) 
 (for Chronology of Bishops) 

1335 deaths
14th-century Roman Catholic bishops in Castile
Bishops appointed by Pope John XXII